The Old Fort is a fort in northeastern Nouakchott, Mauritania. It is located to the northeast of the Presidential Palace, near the Stadium of Ksar and College d'Application.

References

Buildings and structures in Nouakchott
Forts in Mauritania